The Çubuk-1 Dam is a concrete gravity dam on the Çubuk Stream near Çubuk in Ankara Province, Turkey. It is located 12 km north of the center of Ankara and was built to control floods and provide drinking water to the city. Its construction lasted from 1930 to 1936; Mustafa Kemal Atatürk attended its inauguration on November 3, 1936. It was the first concrete dam constructed in Turkey and the first constructed in Ankara, and is recognized by Turkey's Chamber of Civil Engineers as one of the country's top 50 engineering feats. It is owned and maintained by the Turkish State Hydraulic Works and was constructed at a cost of 2.32 million TRY.

The aggregate for the concrete was derived from volcanic rock in nearby areas. The dam's reservoir used to be a popular recreational area. Silt accumulation in the reservoir along with raw sewage being dumped upstream halted water supply from the dam in 1994. Since then, efforts have been ongoing to remove the polluted silt from the former reservoir bed. The area behind the dam will also be restored into a park once complete.

See also
Çubuk-2 Dam
List of dams and reservoirs in Turkey

References

Dams in Ankara Province
Gravity dams
Dams completed in 1936